CUMS may refer to:

Cambridge University Musical Society
Capital University of Medical Sciences